Kim Young-chul (born June 23, 1974), is a South Korean comedian and singer.

Career 
He is currently a cast member in JTBC's Knowing Bros.

He is also noted for his appearance on the popular Korean variety show Infinite Challenge: his unique character and English-speaking abilities were displayed, and he was the subject of a viral internet meme due to his pronunciation of the phrase "Cheer up, super power" sounding like "Cheer up, super po-wall".

In February 2022, Kim published a human essay 'Cry and Laughed.

Discography 
 2016: "Ring Ring" (with. Hong Jin-young)
 2017: "An Ordinary Christmas" (with. JeA)
 2018: "Andenayon" (feat. Wheesung)
 2019: "Signal Light"
 2022: "Marc Got It"

Filmography

Film

Television drama

Television shows

Web shows

Radio shows

Bibliography

Award and nomination

References

External links

Kim Young-chul at Mystic Entertainment official website

Kim Young-chul on Instagram

1974 births
Living people
Mystic Entertainment artists
South Korean male comedians
People from Ulsan
Dongguk University alumni
Gag Concert
Melon Music Award winners